The 2002 Euro Formula 3000 Championship was scheduled over 10 rounds and contested over 9 rounds. 14 different teams, 35 different drivers competed. All teams raced with Lola T99/50 chassis with Zytek engines.

Entries

Race calendar

Note:

Race 1 originally scheduled over 47 laps but stopped early due to rain.

The race in Cagliari was originally scheduled for 10 October.

Results

Note:

Race 1 originally scheduled over 47 laps but stopped early due to rain.

The race in Cagliari was originally scheduled for 10 October.

Championships standings

References

External links
Official Euroseries 3000 site

Euro Formula 3000
Euro Formula 3000
Auto GP
Euro Formula 3000